Megacheuma brevipennis is a species of beetle in the family Cerambycidae, the only species in the genus Megacheuma. It occurs throughout the Great Basin of California, Nevada, Oregon, Utah, and Wyoming, where it feeds on the roots of greasewood (Sarcobatus vermiculatus).

References

Clytini